Dana Tiger (born 1961) is a Muscogee artist of Seminole and Cherokee descent from Oklahoma. Her artwork focuses on portrayals of strong women. She uses art as a medium for activism and raising awareness. Tiger was inducted into the Oklahoma Women's Hall of Fame in 2001.

Biography
Dana Irene Tiger was born in 1961 to Jerome Tiger and Peggy Richmond. Her father was a full blood Native American of Muskogee-Seminole heritage and her mother is a member of the Cherokee Nation. Tiger's father died of an accidental gunshot wound when she was 5 years old and she was raised by her mother. To promote her father's work, keep his legacy alive, and be taken seriously as an art dealer, Tiger's mother ran the business pretending to be a man. Jerome's brother, Johnny Tiger Jr., acted as the family patriarch, told stories of their father to his children, and surrounded them with art.

Tiger attended Oklahoma State University from 1981 to 1984 as a student in the College of Arts and Sciences. She later attended Bacone College.

Tiger first began painting at age 24, after she left Oklahoma State University. Dana was inspired by the legacy of her father, Jerome Tiger, an exemplary artist who revolutionized the portrayal of Native Americans through his unique art style. Her themes of strong women grew out of personal experiences of discrimination and tragedy. She uses art as a medium to empower women. Dana's art is often centered around her sense of womanhood and the strength of those that surround her. Characteristics of her paintings are resilient Native women depicted in both historical and contemporary leadership positions, usually in watercolor or acrylic.

Tiger often combines artwork and advocacy, promoting benefits for the AIDS Coalition for Indian Outreach, the American Cancer Society, the National Organization for Women, and the Ozark Literacy Council among others. Native American health is a particular focus. While promoting healing and growth through art, she is also a mother, sister, and grandmother.

Personal life
Tiger had planned to remain single and dedicate her life to art, but when her brother was murdered in 1990 and her sister was diagnosed with HIV/AIDS two years later, her view of the world changed. She felt that she could honor her siblings by bringing new life into the world. Tiger married Donnie Blair on 7 November 1992. They have two children: a daughter Christie, born 1 September 1993, named after her brother, and a son, Coleman Lisan, born 16 July 1995, named for her sister. Both of her children are award-winning artists.

In 1999, Tiger was diagnosed with Parkinson's disease. Soon after her diagnosis, Tiger's sister Lisa was also diagnosed with Parkinson's. 
 
In 2002, she founded a non-profit organization, Legacy Cultural Learning Community, to foster arts development for Native youth.

Notable works
Tiger's painting We Ride Again was chosen as the cover art for the 2006 Oklahoma Women's Almanac.

A collection of Tiger's work was shown as a part of the Oklahoma Painters exhibition at the Grand Palais, Paris in 2011. She was one of 11 Native American artists who was selected to show at the exhibition.

Some of Tiger's other notable works include:
Totkv 2017 Apex Magazine Cover
Changing The Face of Leadership 2006
Patrol of the Light Horse 1990 National Police Chiefs Convention, Tulsa, OK.
Courage and Culture 1992 AIDS Coalition for Indian Outreach
"Circle of Life" 1993 American Cancer Society, Breast Cancer Awareness Project for Native American Women
Under Control 1993 American Indian College Fund
Beautiful New Worlds 1993 Ozark Literacy Council
Keeping Cultures Fires Burning 1993 National Organization for Women, Oklahoma State Conference
The Healing Dream 1994 Follies, Inc., AIDS Benefit
Wisdom from the Past, Strength for the Future 1995 Conference on the State of the American Indian Family

Awards
Youngest Master Artist by Five Civilized Tribes Museum
Two Best in Show awards at the Five Civilized Tribes Museum Annual Student Art Show
First Place, Watercolor Division, 1988 Tulsa Indian Art Festival, Tulsa, Oklahoma
Special Merit Award, 1988 Trail of Tears Art Show, Tahlequah, Oklahoma
Featured Artist, 1989 Tulsa Indian Art Festival, Tulsa, Oklahoma
Creek Nation Artist of the Year
First People’s Fund Community Spirit Award, 2001
Inductee, Oklahoma Women's Hall of Fame, 2001

References

External links
Artwork by Dana Tiger from Tiger Art Gallery
Oklahoma Native Artists Oral History Project -- OSU Library

1961 births
Muscogee people
Living people
Native American activists
Native American artists
Feminist artists
20th-century Native Americans
21st-century Native Americans
20th-century Native American women
21st-century Native American women